Fontana station is a train station served by Metrolink San Bernardino Line commuter rail, located in the city of Fontana, California. It is immediately adjacent to Fontana's Downtown District.  It has 340 free parking spaces.

The station opened on November 22, 1993, and is owned and operated by the City of Fontana.    

  

Omnitrans public bus service maintains a transit center next to the station and connections are available to bus routes 10, 14, 15, 19, 20, 61, 66, 67, and 82, and Victor Valley Transit Authority (VVTA) Line 15. The 61 bus connects to Ontario Airport.

References

External links 

Official Omnitrans website: Fontana Metrolink station (bus routes—schedules)

Fontana, California
Metrolink stations in San Bernardino County, California
Bus stations in San Bernardino County, California
Railway stations in the United States opened in 1993
1993 establishments in California